Ministry of Culture and Sport may refer to:

Ministry of Culture and Sport (Spain)
Ministry of Culture and Sports (Greece)
Ministry of Culture and Sports (Kazakhstan)
Ministry of Culture and Sport (Israel)
Ministry of Culture, Heritage, Tourism and Sport (Manitoba)
Ministry of Culture, Sports and Tourism (South Korea)
Ministry of Culture and Sports (Qatar)
Department for Digital, Culture, Media and Sport (United Kingdom)

See also
 Ministry of Culture and Tourism (disambiguation)
 Ministry of Education and Culture
 Culture minister
 Sports minister